Cuango River may refer to:
Kwango River, Democratic Republic of Congo/Angola, or;
 Rio Cuanga, near Cuango, Panama.